Narathu was a Burmese royal title of kings, and may refer to:

 Narathu of Pagan: King of Pagan (r. 1167−71)
 Narathu of Pinya: King of Pinya (r. 1359−64)

Burmese royal titles